Fructose-bisphosphatase 2 is a protein that in humans is encoded by the FBP2 gene.

Function

This gene encodes a gluconeogenesis regulatory enzyme which catalyzes the hydrolysis of fructose 2,6-bisphosphate to fructose 6-phosphate and inorganic phosphate.

References

Further reading